Triyanto Triwikromo is an Indonesian writer born in Salatiga, Central Java.

He graduated from Diponegoro University in Semarang with a master's degree in literature. He worked as a lecturer in Creative Writing at his alma mater and as a managing editor at the daily newspaper Suara Merdeka.
He has written collections of short stories, Rezim Seks (Regime of Sex), Ragaula, Sayap Anjing (Dog Wings), Anak-anak Mengasah Pisau (Children Sharpening the Knives), Malam Sepasasang Lampion (The Night of a Pair of Paper Lanterns).

He participated in the Utan Kayu International Literary Biennale in East Jakarta in 2005 and 2007 as well as Wordstorm: Northern Territory Festival in Darwin, Australia in 2005. He was a speaker of the Ubud Writers Festival in Ubud, Bali, in 2008. He was one of the authors of a collection of short stories, LA Underlover, in 2008. His collection of poetry Pertempuran Rahasia (Secret Combat) was published in 2010, and his short story collection Surga Sungsang (Wrong Side Up Heaven) was published in 2014. He was chosen as one of the five greatest fiction writers in the Kusala Sastra Khatulistiwa Literary Award 2014.
He was the winner of the 2009 Language Center Literary Award for the short story collection, Ular di Mangkuk Nabi (The Snake in the Prophet's Bowl). Ten of his short stories in the Kompas Choice Short Stories Collection from 2003 to 2012 were published in book form as Celeng Satu Celeng Semua (One Wild Pig All Wild Pigs). His short story Cahaya Sunyi Ibu (Mother's Quiet Night) was carried in the 2008 Golden Pen Literary Award for 20 Best Indonesian Short Stories.

From 2012 to 2013, he was involved in implementing the citybooks program that was produced by deBuren, a renowned Belgian cultural organisation. The translation of his long poems about Semarang into Dutch, English and French. And his short stories translated into Swedish and English.

Publications

References

External links
 Baca Puisi Triyanto Triwikromo
 goodreads
Jakarta Globe

1964 births
Living people
People from Salatiga
Indonesian writers
Diponegoro University alumni
Indonesian journalists